Oborový podnik (o.p.; translation — "specialized business") is a bygone Czechoslovakian state designation for a business entity.  As was always the case, the commercial name of the entity was followed by the name of its legal structure, either spelled out (viz., "Oborový podník,") or abbreviated in lower case (viz., "o.p.")

See also 
 Compare to Státní podnik (s.p.)

References 

Legal entities
Types of business entity
Czech Republic business terminology